Bruno-Pyatt may refer to:
 Bruno–Pyatt High School, in Marion County, Arkansas
 Bruno-Pyatt School District, a defunct school district in Marion County, Arkansas